Jamie Neil Grimes (born 22 December 1990) is an English professional footballer who plays for and captains National League club Chesterfield.

Club career
In July 2017, Grimes signed for League Two club Cheltenham Town from Dover Athletic on a free transfer. Grimes made his EFL debut for Cheltenham against Morecambe, on 5 August 2017. On 10 May 2018, it was announced that Grimes would leave Cheltenham at the end of his current deal in June 2018.

Following his release from Cheltenham, Grimes joined fellow League Two side Macclesfield Town, signing a one-year deal. Whilst at the club, Grimes was subject of unpaid wages from the club, leading to a winding up order set for September 2019. Grimes left the club after just one season and returned to Kent to play for Ebbsfleet United. Grimes departed the club after one season with the club having been relegated in the early curtailed season, finding themselves in the relegation zone after the season was determined on a points-per-game basis.

On 4 August 2020, Grimes joined National League North side Hereford on a one-year deal. Following the early curtailment of the season due to the ongoing COVID-19 pandemic, Grimes appeared at Wembley in the FA Trophy Final as Hereford lost a one-goal lead to lose 3–1 to Hornchurch. Grimes was offered a new deal with the club at the end of the season however he turned down this contract offer.

Chesterfield
On 15 June 2021, Grimes agreed a deal to join Chesterfield.

References

External links

1990 births
Living people
Footballers from Nottingham
English footballers
Association football defenders
Leicester City F.C. players
Swansea City A.F.C. players
Haverfordwest County A.F.C. players
Redditch United F.C. players
Brackley Town F.C. players
Bedford Town F.C. players
Kidderminster Harriers F.C. players
Worcester City F.C. players
Dover Athletic F.C. players
Cheltenham Town F.C. players
Ebbsfleet United F.C. players
Hereford F.C. players
Chesterfield F.C. players
National League (English football) players
English Football League players
Southern Football League players